Haploscythris is a genus of moths in the family Scythrididae.

Species
 Haploscythris albifuscella Bengtsson, 2014
 Haploscythris brachiohirsutella Bengtsson, 2014
 Haploscythris brachiotruncella Bengtsson, 2014
 Haploscythris brunneopicta Bengtsson, 2014
 Haploscythris canispersa (Meyrick, 1913)
 Haploscythris chloraema (Meyrick, 1887)
 Haploscythris coffeella Bengtsson, 2014
 Haploscythris eberti Bengtsson, 2014
 Haploscythris haackei Bengtsson, 2014
 Haploscythris indecorella Bengtsson, 2014
 Haploscythris kuboosensis Bengtsson, 2014
 Haploscythris melanodora (Meyrick, 1912)
 Haploscythris obstans (Meyrick, 1928)
 Haploscythris ochrosuffusella Bengtsson, 2014
 Haploscythris paulianella Viette, 1956
 Haploscythris pugilella Bengtsson, 2014
 Haploscythris quadrivalvella Bengtsson, 2014
 Haploscythris richtersveldensis Bengtsson, 2014
 Haploscythris scoblei Bengtsson, 2014
 Haploscythris sordidella (Bengtsson, 2002)
 Haploscythris streyi Bengtsson, 2014
 Haploscythris valvaecrinitus Bengtsson, 2014
 Haploscythris vansoni Bengtsson, 2014
 Haploscythris vredendalensis Bengtsson, 2014
 Haploscythris vulturoides Bengtsson, 2014
 Haploscythris youngai Bengtsson, 2014

References

 2014: The Afrotropical Scythrididae. Esperiana, Buchreihe zur Entomologie, Memoir 7: 5-361. Abstract: 

Scythrididae